The Shirin and Farhad Tree or Rahmat tree is a 700-year-old tree of the genus Platanus located in the historical area of Taq Bostan in Kermanshah, Iran.

See also
 List of individual trees

References

Individual trees in Iran
Individual plane trees
Kermanshah